Acanthocardia tuberculata, the rough cockle, is a species of  saltwater clam, a cockle, a marine bivalve mollusc in the family Cardiidae. The genus Acanthocardia is present from the Upper Oligocene to the Recent.

Description
The shell of Acanthocardia tuberculata can reach a size of about 95 mm. This shell is robust, equivalve, inflated and slightly inequilateral, with crenulated margins. The surface shows 18-20 strong radial ribs, with rows of spiny nodules. The basic coloration is usually pale brown with alternating darker concentric bands.

<div align=center>
Right and left valve of the same specimen:

</div align=center>

Distribution and habitat
Acanthocardia tuberculata can be found in the Mediterranean Sea and in the Northeast Atlantic Ocean. This species is present in the continental shelf from low tide to 200 m. Like most other bivalves, these mollusks are suspension feeders filtering phytoplankton.

Subspecies
 Acanthocardia tuberculata citrinum Brusina, 1865
 Acanthocardia tuberculata tuberculata (Linnaeus, 1758)
 Acanthocardia tuberculata f. alba

Gallery

References
 Repetto G., Orlando F. & Arduino G. (2005): Conchiglie del Mediterraneo, Amici del Museo "Federico Eusebio", Alba, Italy
 Biolib
 Encyclopedia of life
 World Register of Marine Species.
 Marine Species Identification
 Marine bivalve shells of the British Isles

Cardiidae
Bivalves described in 1758
Taxa named by Carl Linnaeus